Diplodactylus nebulosus is a species of geckos endemic to Australia.

References

Diplodactylus
Geckos of Australia
Reptiles described in 2013
Taxa named by Paul Doughty
Taxa named by Paul M. Oliver